CCA2 can refer to:
 cryptographic Adaptive chosen-ciphertext attack
 ICAO airport code of New Germany Water Aerodrome